"The Twelve Dancing Princesses" (or "The Worn-Out Dancing Shoes" or "The Shoes that were Danced to Pieces") is a German fairy tale collected by the Brothers Grimm and published in Grimm's Fairy Tales in 1815 (KHM 133). It is of Aarne-Thompson type 306.

Charles Deulin collected another, French version in his Contes du Roi Cambrinus (1874), which he credited to the Grimm version.  Alexander Afanasyev collected two Russian variants, entitled "The Night Dances", in his Narodnye russkie skazki.

Its closest analogue is the Scottish Kate Crackernuts, where it is a prince who is obliged to dance every night.

Origin 
The tale was published by the Brothers Grimm in the first edition of Kinder- und Hausmärchen, volume 2, in 1857. Their source was Jenny von Droste-Hülshoff. It was originally numbered 47 but appeared as KHM 133 in subsequent editions.

Synopsis
Twelve princesses sleep in twelve beds in the same room. Every night, their doors are securely locked by their father. But in the morning, their dancing shoes are found to be worn through as if they had been dancing all night. The king, perplexed, asks his daughters to explain, but they refuse. The king then promises his kingdom and each daughter to any man who can discover the princesses' midnight secret within three days and three nights, but those who fail within the set time limit will be sentenced to death.

An old soldier returned from war comes to the king's call after several princes have failed in the attempt. Whilst traveling through a wood he comes upon an old woman, who gives him an enchanted cloak that he can use to observe the king's unaware daughters and tells him not to eat or drink anything given to him in the evening by any of the princesses and to pretend to be fast asleep until they leave.

The soldier is well received at the palace just as the others had been and indeed, in the evening, the princess royal (the eldest daughter) comes to his chamber and offers him a cup of wine. The soldier, remembering the old woman's advice, secretly throws it away and begins to snore loudly as if asleep.

The twelve princesses, assured that the soldier is asleep, dress themselves in fine dancing gowns and escape from their room by a trap door in the floor. The soldier, seeing this, puts on his magic cloak and follows them. He steps on the gown of the youngest princess, whose cry of alarm to her sisters is rebuffed by the eldest. The passageway leads them to three groves of trees; the first having leaves of silver, the second of gold, and the third of glittering diamonds. The soldier, wishing for a token, breaks off a twig of each as evidence. They walk on until they come upon a great clear lake. Twelve boats, with twelve princes, appear where the twelve princesses are waiting. Each princess gets into one, and the soldier steps into the same boat with the twelfth and youngest princess. The youngest princess complains that the prince is not rowing fast enough, not knowing the soldier is in the boat. On the other side of the lake stands a castle, into which all the princesses go and dance the night away.

The twelve princesses happily dance all night until their shoes are worn through and they are obliged to leave. The strange adventure continues on the second and third nights, and everything happens just as before, except that on the third night the soldier carries away a golden cup as a token of where he has been. When it comes time for him to declare the princesses' secret, he goes before the king with the three branches and the golden cup, and tells the king about all he has seen. The princesses know that there is no use in denying the truth, and confess. The soldier chooses the eldest princess as his bride for he is not a very young man, and is made the King's heir. The twelve princes are put under a curse for as many nights as they danced with the princesses.

Background
The Brothers Grimm learned the tale from their friends, the Haxthausens, who had heard the tale in Münster. Other versions were known in Hesse and Paderborn. In the Hesse version, only one princess is believed to be responsible for wearing out a dozen shoes every night until a young shoemaker's apprentice discovers that she is joined by eleven other princesses in the revels. The spell is broken, and the apprentice marries the princess. In the Paderborn version, it is three princesses who dance nightly in a palace escorted by three giants. This version introduces the ruse of the soldier disposing of the drugged wine and pretending to be asleep.

Victorian editors disliked the "do or die" aspect imposed upon those willing to discover the Princesses' whereabouts, and found ways to avoid it. The candidates who failed simply vanished without explanation instead of being sent to their deaths. Andrew Lang's version has the questing princes vanish and it is revealed they have been enchanted and trapped in the underground world. The hero of Lang's version is a cowherd named Michael, who marries the youngest princess, Lina, not the eldest. Her sisters each marry one of the contestants once they are freed from the enchantment.

The garden of trees with gold, silver, and diamond leaves recalls a similar garden in the Sumerian epic of Gilgamesh.

The Princesses in the Grimms' version are often portrayed as somewhat malicious characters, showing no remorse for lying to their father, and repeatedly giving their suitors drugged wine to ensure that their mystery remains unsolved, despite knowing that those who fail are put to death in some versions of the story.

Variants
The tale is not likely to be earlier than the 17th century and many variants are known from different countries.

 Europe:
 Scotland – Katie Crackernuts or Katherine Crackernuts
 France – The Twelve Dancing Princesses
 Portugal – The Moorish Prince and the Christian Princess, The Seven Iron Slippers
 Germany – The Shoes That Were Danced to Pieces, The Twelve Dancing Princesses
 Denmark – The Princess with the Twelve Pair of Golden Shoes
 Iceland – Hild, Queen of the Elves; Hildur the Fairy Queen; Hildur, the Queen of the Elves
 Czech Republic – The Three Girls
 Slovakia – The Three Girls
 Hungary – The Hell-Bent Misses, The Invisible Shepherd Lad
 Romania – The Slippers of the Twelve Princesses, The Twelve Princesses with the Worn-Out Slipper
 Russia – The Danced Out Shoes; Elena the Wise; The Midnight Dance; The Secret Ball
 Armenia – The Giant-Slayer
 Africa:
 Cape Verde – The Shoes That Were Danced To Pieces; Dividing the Heirlooms: The Shoes That Were Danced To Pieces
 Middle East:
 Turkey – The Magic Turban, the Magic Whip, and the Magic Carpet
 Arabic - The Golden City
 Asia:
 India – Dorani, "The Invisible Woman"
 Bengal – The Kotwal’s Daughter, The Rose of Bakáwalí

In variants, the princesses vary in number, sometimes being just one maiden. In other variants, the princess goes to a night dance with a supernatural character, such as the Devil.

A French literary version exists, penned by Charles Deulin in his Contes du Roi Cambrinus.

Adaptations 

Sophie Kahn wrote an adaptation of this well known fairy tale titled "Dancing Through the Night".
 Jeanette Winterson varies and adds to this tale in Sexing the Cherry, in which the old soldier is a prince with 11 brothers, each of which marries a sister except the youngest, who escapes before her wedding to the prince.
 A 1977 East German TV-Movie made in partnership with Fernsehen der DDR & DEFA. In this version there are seven instead of 12.
 Happily Ever After: Fairy Tales for Every Child had an episode called "The Twelve Dancing Princesses".
 In Barbie in the 12 Dancing Princesses, Barbie plays the role of the 7th sister, Genevieve. This version takes extensive liberties: the princesses are escaping from an evil governess who won't let them dance in the castle (and turns out to be poisoning their father), and the series of men trying to discover their secret is replaced with Derek, a royal cobbler who actively aids them and becomes Genevieve's love interest. 
 It was a storybook and cassette in the Once Upon a Time Fairy Tale series.
 In 1978, a made-for-TV retelling of the story was directed by Ben Rea, featuring Jim Dale as the Soldier, Freddie Jones as the destitute King, and Gloria Grahame as the Witch. Significant changes were made to the story, including reducing the number of princesses to six, and the soldier ultimately declining to marry any of the princesses due to their deceitful nature.
 It was retold in literature as  Walter de la Mare's Told Again and Tales Told Again and in Robin McKinley's The Door in the Hedge.
 In some versions, such as the one in Robin McKinley's The Door in the Hedge and Ellen Kushner's in Troll's-Eye View, the eldest princess disguises herself as an old woman to give the soldier life-saving advice.
 Patricia A. McKillip wrote an adaptation for the anthology A Wolf at the Door.  It has a few variations, the most significant being that the princes who the princesses were spending their nights dancing with were actually dead, and planning to take the princesses away from the mortal world forever the night after the soldier reveals what the princesses were doing.
 The Once Upon a Time novel series published by Simon Pulse featured a retelling of the story as The Night Dance by Suzanne Weyn.  The story is set in Arthurian legends, with Vivienne, the Lady of the Lake, as the mother of the twelve princesses.
 The children's television show Super Why! included an episode called "The Twelve Dancing Princesses" (Season 1. Episode 21, April 7, 2008). In this adaptation, the king asks the Super Readers to find out where his daughters are disappearing to each night. When their secret is discovered, the princesses confess to the Super Readers that they have been planning a surprise party for their father, which everyone gets to attend.
 Anne Sexton wrote an adaptation as a poem called "The Twelve Dancing Princesses" in her collection Transformations (1971), a book in which she re-envisions sixteen of the Grimm's Fairy tales.
 The Juliet Marillier novel Wildwood Dancing gives a retelling set in Transylvania, mixed with traditional Transylvanian folk tales. The underground kingdom they dance in is the fairy kingdom, to which they have gained entrance by the grace of the Witch of the Wood.
 Jessica Day George's novel Princess of the Midnight Ball is a retelling with the twist that the princesses are cursed to dance every night for an evil sorcerer, the King Under Stone.
 The television series Faerie Tale Theatre had an episode entitled "The Dancing Princesses". There were six princesses as opposed to twelve, but otherwise the story remains the same.
 The anime series Grimm's Fairy Tale Classics, is based on the Grimm's variant that has only three princesses: Genevieve is the eldest, her middle sister is named Louise, and the youngest is named Julia. It features a twist within the story - it turns out demons live within the magical palace and have placed a spell on Genevieve (and then Louise and Julia) before the soldier, a handsome young man named Peter, realizes the truth and rescues them. In this version, the failed suitors are sent to prison instead of executed and the king frees them once Peter solves the mystery. Additionally Peter acquires the magic cloak and some magic shoes from a kappa and another demon who take the form of two men who were arguing over the cloak and shoes; Peter tricks them into competing over the cloak and shoes which allows him to steal them, after which he discovers them to be demons. The cloak makes him invisible and allows him to see through the demon's illusion, while the shoes allow him to levitate and move quickly. After freeing the girls from their trance Peter aids them in fleeing from the demons, though he loses the cloak and shoes in the process; in return, Genevieve and then her sisters help him when the demons almost pull him back inside their world. At the end Peter and Genevieve fall in love and happily marry.
 Heather Dixon's novel, Entwined, retells the story from the point of view of Azalea, the oldest of the 12 sisters.
 Jim Weiss narrates a more child-friendly version of this story on his audio CD Best Loved Stories.  In this version, the protagonist is portrayed as an unwitting war hero, and is offered milk, not wine, by the princesses.  Failed attempts at discovering the princesses' secret results in banishment from the kingdom instead of death.  Finally, the protagonist, named Carl Gustav in this version, chooses the youngest daughter ("Rosebud") and to be the steward of all of the King's gardens rather than choosing the oldest to become heir to the throne.
 Genevieve Valentine's The Girls at the Kingfisher Club is a novel-length reimagining of the fairytale that is set in New York City in the Jazz Age.  The twelve sisters are kept in the upper story of their father's brownstone because he is embarrassed at his failure to produce a male heir.
 In 1990, Laura Bedore, Dorothy Keddington and Stephanie Clark published a stage version of The Twelve Dancing Princesses.  In this family friendly musical, the 12 princes are sent to the dungeon after their failure to solve the mystery of the shoes but are reunited with their princesses after the soldier, aided by a befriended witch, is able to do so.
 The story has been added to the many that exist in Ever After High. A web series, film, and two book series. The character Justine Dancer is the daughter of the 12th and youngest dancing princess.
In Mirrored, a book by Alex Flinn, Kendra the witch briefly mentions the Twelve Dancing Princesses as a time that she lived through.
Adapted into a play by I.E. Clark in 1969.
"Hawa Hawa", a Hindi song from the 2011 Indian film Rockstar, is based on the Czech version of the fairy tale.
House of Salt and Sorrows is another retelling of the tale by Erin A. Craig with a darker twist. Set in a peaceful island, it follows the story of Annaleigh, the sixth daughter, as she and her family do their best to recover from the deaths of her four oldest sisters and the supposed curse that surrounds their family.
All the Queen's Sons by Elizabeth Kipps changes the genders of both the father and the princes, and tells the story from the point of view of the shoemaker's daughter, who is intent on solving the mystery of the princes' worn-out shoes.
Another Hungarian variant of the tale was adapted into an episode of the Hungarian television series Magyar népmesék ("Hungarian Folk Tales") (hu), with the title A papucsszaggató királykisasszonyok ("The Slipper-Tearing Princesses"). In this version, the three princesses mount on magical brooms and travel to a secret location to dance with devils on a floor of razor.
The novel A Dance of Silver and Shadow by Melanie Cellier is a retelling of the classic fairy tale in her series Beyond the Four Kingdoms.
Classix Animation Studios second animated feature, 12 Princesses Goes beyond, the king is coping with his wife's death and is driven to a mad state, and the series of men is replaced with Yannick, a farm boy who becomes Princess December's love interest and the main protagonist.
The Midnight Dancers by Regina Doman, 2008 novel set in contemporary times.

See also
La Ramée and the Phantom
The Princess in the Chest
Princess of the Midnight Ball, Jessica Day George's adaption of the tale
Entwined, Heather Dixon's adaptation
Wildwood Dancing, Juliet Marillier‘s adaptation

Notes

Further reading
 Rodriguez, Juan Santiago Quirós. ""La danza de las trece princesas": Versión guanacasteca de un viejo cuento europeo". In: Filología y Lingüística XIX (l): 129-133 (1993). DOI:10.15517/rfl.v19i1.20897

External links

 
 The Shoes That Were Danced to Pieces Another translation of the German
 
 . Translated by Margaret Hunt.

Grimms' Fairy Tales
Fictional princesses
Fictional footwear
Fiction about magic
German fairy tales
Female characters in fairy tales
Indian fairy tales
Indian folklore
Indian literature
ATU 300-399
12 (number)
Works about princesses